The Forsaken: An American Tragedy in Stalin's Russia by Tim Tzouliadis is a 2008 book published by Penguin Books. It tells the story of thousands of Americans who immigrated to the Soviet Union in the 1930s.

Background

Immigration
In the first eight months of 1931, a Soviet trade agency in New York advertised 6,000 positions and received more than 100,000 applications.  Ten thousand Americans were hired in 1931, part of the official "organized emigration".

In February 1931, The New York Times reported:

In March 1932, The New York Times reported that immigration to the Soviet Union was 1000 a week, but increasing.

Soon, an official edict was issued that in the future all Americans must carry a round-trip ticket and would no longer be given jobs, simply because there was not enough space to house them all. Moscow and all the major Russian cities were already overcrowded.

The Foreign Workers' Club of Moscow baseball team, a group of Americans, played regular games in Gorky Park.

In the summer of 1932, the Soviet Supreme Council of Physical Culture announced its decision to introduce baseball to the Soviet Union as a "national sport".

The American immigrants opened an Anglo-American school in Moscow, with 125 pupils on the register by November 1932, three quarters of them born in the United States.  Over the next three years, enrollment rose so high that the Anglo-American school moved into a larger school, School Number 24 on Great Vuysovsky Street.

Gulag imprisonment and executions 
By 1937, many of the Americans were arrested alongside untold numbers of Soviet citizens. Some were executed. Others were sent to "corrective labor" camps in the Gulag where they were worked to death.

Reception
The New York Sun: "The horror that was Stalinist Russia is still incomprehensible to many Americans...Reading this book is certain to open their eyes."
 The Daily Telegraph:  "Tim Tzouliadis's gripping and important book - has never been fully told before. This is an extremely impressive book."
  Financial Times:  "Tzouliadis's clear, strong narrative discloses the terrible fates which awaited those... who wandered into the Soviet sphere.... [A] grim, brilliantly told story."
 Publishers Weekly:  "When Tzouliadis focuses on individual stories, such as that of Thomas Sgovio, who was imprisoned for almost a quarter-century before being allowed to return to the West, his words leap off the page. Too often, however, he veers away from his main subject with criticism of American journalists, ambassadors, artists and fellow travelers."
 Kirkus Reviews: "Tzouliadis's narrative—though rather tuneless—holds the reader's attention and illuminates an overlooked chapter in 20th-century history."

See also
Americans in the Gulag
 Coming Out of the Ice, Victor Herman - a memoir by an American who was imprisoned in Gulag camps
 Robert Robinson (engineer)
 The Moscow News
 The Eternal Road (film)

Further  reading 
 Robert Robinson, Black on Red: My Forty-four Years Inside the Soviet Union (Washington, D.C.:Acropolis, 1988).
 Julia Ioffee. (October 21, 2017). The History of Russian Involvement in America's Race Wars. The Atlantic.

Notes

American people imprisoned abroad
Prisoners and detainees of the Soviet Union
American emigrants to the Soviet Union
American people imprisoned in the Soviet Union
Books critical of communism